The British Racing School is one of the two racing schools in the United Kingdom. Established in 1983, it is a charitable trust providing training for young people working in the horse racing industry.

The school is based in Newmarket, Suffolk, and offers a wide range of courses for jockeys, trainers, exercise riders, and racing secretaries. It also runs the Pony Racing Academy and bi-annual Pony Racing Camps for children aged between 11 and 16 who wish to compete in the growing sport of Pony Racing.

It is accredited by the British Horse Society, and  a 2011 inspection report outcome of 2, Good. Grant Harris is the current chief executive of the British Racing School.

History 

The British Racing School first started in 1969 at Great Bookham in Surrey before moving to the National Equestrian Centre at Stoneleigh, Warwickshire. In 1979 it moved again to the Earl of March’s Goodwood Estate until finally a permanent base was set up in Newmarket at the 120-acre site just north of the town centre.

Funding 

The school costs around £3 million per year to run and relies on charitable donations and government funding via the Skills Funding Agency and the Education Funding Agency (EFA), which accounts for approximately 65 per cent of income for delivering the Apprenticeship in Racehorse Care and Advanced Apprenticeship in Racehorse Care and Management. Twenty per cent of funding is generated from course fees,  including courses for jockeys, racehorse trainers, racing secretaries, management training and Pony Racing, as well as training courses for jockeys from overseas. The remainder of the income is generated from the trading arm, BRS Training Limited, a 100 per cent-owned subsidiary of the British Racing School which operates a conference facility from its site in Newmarket.

Notable alumni 

Graduates of the British Racing School include:

Paul Hanagan, former champion Flat jockey
Ryan Mania, Grand National-winning jockey
Seb Sanders, former champion Flat jockey
Sam Thomas, Cheltenham Gold Cup-winning jockey
Willie Carson (jnr), Flat jockey
Jason Weaver, Classic-winning Flat jockey

References
 
Adult Learning Inspectorate awards British Racing School outstanding grade

Training feature from horseandrideruk.com

Link from lovetheraces.com, official site of Great British Racing

Retired top-class steeplechaser Our Vic joins the British Racing School, from the website of racehorse trainer David Pipe

Matthew Hancock MP experiences Apprentice Week at the British Racing School

External links

Horse racing
Jockey schools
Horse racing organisations in Great Britain